Emil Bulls is a German rock band that was formed in 1995 in Munich, Bavaria. The group consists of two guitarists, a bass guitar player, a drummer and a vocalist/guitarist.

History 
In 1995, Christoph "Christ" von Freydorf (vocals) and Stefan "Fini" Finauer (drums), pupils of a convent school, founded the band together with Christoph's church choir friend Jamie "Citnoh" Richardson (bass guitar). They were joined by Stephan Karl "Moik" and Franz Wickenhäuser (both guitar). The band was founded in Hohenschäftlarn near Munich. The name Emil Bulls is derived from a children's movie.

In 1996, they recorded their first CD Red Dick's Potatoe Garden themselves. In 1997, they attended the Emergenza festival, won the regional finals in Munich and finished third in the European competition. For this competition they hired DJ Paul Rzyttka (known as DJ Zamzoe) who afterwards became a permanent member of the band.

After a long tour, their album Monogamy was released by the indie record label Oh My Sweet Records. The record could only be purchased through the internet or during live shows. Monogamy was noticed by Island Records, which offered the band a recording deal. Some of the songs on Monogamy and a few new songs were recorded. The result was Angel Delivery Service, released in 2001. The album was already out of stock a few months later. A new edition was released including a cover version of A-Ha's "Take on Me". The songs "Smells Like Rock 'n' Roll", "Leaving You with This" and "Take on Me" were released as singles.

In May 2002, Porcelain was released through Motor Music. "The Coolness of Being Wretched" and "This Day" were released as singles. Between June 2001 and August 2002, the band played 129 live shows including Rock am Ring. In August 2003, drummer Stefan Finauer left the band to go to university. He was replaced by Fabian Fab Füß. In 2003, the band played some shows in Canada and the United States.

On 20 June 2005, The Southern Comfort was released on Pirate Records. It was the last record with DJ Zamzoe.

In February 2007, the live and acoustic album The Life Acoustic was released. The album, which was recorded in Pullach in 2006, was followed by an acoustic tour.

The following album The Black Path was released on 4 April 2008, on Drakkar records. It is the hardest record of the band so far and was recorded in Hannover by Benny Richer (Caliban, Krypteria). The single "The Most Evil Spell" was offered as a free download.

In 2009, Chrissy Schneider left the band and was replaced by Andy Bock, who was the guitar player of From Constant Visions. On 25 September 2009, Phoenix was released. "Here Comes The Fire" was offered as a free download on their website. In September 2009, a music video of "When God Was Sleeping" was released.

The band's next studio offering, Oceanic, was to be released on 30 September 2011.

In 2014 the band recorded new album Sacrifice to Venus and released it on 8 August the same year.

In the beginning of 2016 band released double best-of compilation XX. CD1 contained acoustic versions of best Emil Bulls songs while on CD2 there were original versions.

The latest Emil Bulls studio album called Kill Your Demons was released on 29 September 2017.

Discography

Studio albums

Independent releases 
 1995: Made In India
 1997: Red Dick's Potatoe Garden
 1998: Fell Sick EP
 2000: Monogamy

Major-label releases 
 2001: Angel Delivery Service
 2003: Porcelain
 2005: The Southern Comfort
 2008: The Black Path
 2009: Phoenix
 2011: Oceanic
 2014: Sacrifice to Venus (#6 Germany)
 2014: Those Were the Days: Best Of
 2016: XX
 2017: Kill Your Demons
 2019: Mixtape

Live albums 
 2007: The Life Acoustic

DVDs 
 2003: Mud, Blood and Beer
 2010: The Feast

Singles 
 2001: "Smells Like Rock 'n' Roll"
 2001: "Leaving You with This"
 2001: "Take On Me"
 2003: "The Coolness of Being Wretched"
 2003: "This Day"
 2006: "Newborn"
 2006: "Revenge"
 2008: "The Most Evil Spell"
 2009: "When God Was Sleeping"
 2011: "Between the Devil and the Deep Blue Sea"
 2011: "The Jaws of Oblivion"
 2012: "The Knight in Shining Armour"
 2012: "Not Tonight Josephine"
 2014: "Hearteater"
 2014: "Pants Down"
 2017: "The Ninth Wave"
 2017: "Kill Your Demons"

Music videos 
 2001: "Leaving You with This"
 2001: "Take On Me"
 2001: "Smells Like Rock 'n' Roll"
 2003: "This Day"
 2003: "Serenity now"
 2005: "Newborn"
 2005: "Mongoose"
 2005: "Friday Night"
 2008: "The Most Evil Spell"
 2008: "Worlds Apart"
 2009: "When God Was Sleeping"
 2009: "Nothing in This World"
 2010: "The Architects of My Apocalypse"
 2011: "The Jaws of Oblivion"
 2011: "Between the Devil and the Deep Blue Sea"
 2012: "The Knight in Shining Armour"
 2012: "Not Tonight Josephine"
 2014: "Pants Down"

References

External links 

 Official website
 

German nu metal musical groups
Musical groups established in 1995